Del Valle High School can refer to:
 Del Valle High School (El Paso, Texas)
 Del Valle High School (Travis County, Texas)